Gerritsen is a Dutch patronymic surname "son of Gerrit". It is particularly common in the province of Gelderland. Variations on this name include Gerritse, Gerrits, Garritsen and Gerretse(n). Notable people with the surname include:

Alida Gerritsen-de Vries (1914–2007), Dutch sprinter
Annette Gerritsen (born 1985), Dutch speed skater
Carel Victor Gerritsen, (1850–1905), Dutch radical politician and feminist
Jim Gerritsen, American organic farmer and trade unionist
 (born 1972), Dutch writer
Lisa Gerritsen (born "Orszag" 1957), American actor
Maico Gerritsen (born 1986), Dutch footballer
Marcel Gerritsen (born 1967), Dutch cyclist
Margot Gerritsen, engineering professor at Stanford University
Mees Gerritsen (born 1939), Dutch Olympic cyclist
Patrick Gerritsen (born 1987), Dutch footballer
Paul Gerritsen (born 1984), New Zealand rower
Rinus Gerritsen (born 1946), Dutch bassist
Rupert Gerritsen (1953–2013), Australian historian
Tess Gerritsen (born 1953), American novelist
Tim Gerritsen, American video game producer and designer
Wendy Gerritsen (born 1972), Dutch cricketer
Gerrits
Antonie Gerrits (1885–1969), Dutch cyclist
Evelien Gerrits (born 1985), Dutch cricketer
Travis Gerrits (born 1991), Canadian freestyle skier
Gerritse
Willem Wouter Gerritse (born 1983), Dutch water polo player
Garritsen
Margaret Garritsen de Vries (1922–2009), American IMF economist and historian
Martijn Garritsen (born 1996), Dutch DJ better known as Mar+in Garri×
Nel Garritsen (1933–2014), Dutch swimmer

See also
Gerritsen Beach, Brooklyn and Gerritsen Creek, a New York City neighborhood and watercourse named after the Dutch settler Wolphert Gerretse

References

Dutch-language surnames
Patronymic surnames
Surnames from given names